Shobha De (née Rajadhyaksha, formerly Kilachand; born 7 January 1948) is an Indian novelist and columnist. She is best known for her depiction of socialites and sex in her works of fiction, for which she has been referred to as the "Jackie Collins of India."

Early life and education
Shobhaa De was born on 7 January 1948 in Mumbai into a Marathi Brahmin family. Her father was a district court judge, and her mother was a home-maker. The youngest of four siblings, she has two sisters and a brother.

Shobha grew up in Mumbai, where she attended Queen Mary School. She graduated from Saint Xavier's College.

Career
At age 17, she began her career as a model, which lasted for five years. At age 20, she began her career as a journalist, writing "agony aunt" advice columns and features for society magazines. She founded the magazine Stardust at age 23, which included Bollywood interviews, gossip, and photographs.

In the 1980s, she contributed to the Sunday magazine section of The Times of India. She has since been a regular columnist for several newspapers. She has also written several popular soaps on television.

Ankita Shukla wrote for The Times of India, in 2016, that "unignorable has been Shobhaa De's unabashed description of the womenfolk in her novels. De's women range from traditional, subjugated and marginalized to the extremely modern and liberated women. De's novels take a leaf the urban life and represent realistically an intimate side of urban woman's life, also revealing her plight in the present day society." In 1992, Mark Fineman of the Los Angeles Times described her as "India's hottest-selling English-language novelist," and how her second novel, Starry Nights (1991), had "a drawing of a nude woman on the front cover," and according to De, "they said it was the first time they’d broken through the ‘F’ barrier, the first time they’d run the F-word without asterisks." Urmee Khan writes for The Guardian in 2007, "Her books are steeped in a lifetime's observation of Bollywood," and "They describe a side of the country that western audiences rarely encounter, her central themes being power, greed, lust and sex."

In 2010, De and Penguin Books created the publishing imprint Shobhaa De Books.

De has also participated in several literary festivals, including the Bangalore Literature Festival, having been part of it since its first edition.

Personal life
Shobha has married twice and has often said that she is the mother of six children, which includes two stepchildren. 

Directly after graduation, Shobha married Sudhir Vrajlal Kilachand, of the Kilachand Marwadi business family. They quickly became the parents of two children, a son, Aditya Kilachand, and a daughter, Avantika. The marriage ended in divorce. 

Shobha then married Dilip De, a businessman in the shipping industry, and a Bengali. This was Dilip's second marriage also, and he has two children by his previous marriage. Shobha and Dilip De became the parents of a further two daughters, Arundhati and Anandita.

Books
 Srilaaji – Diary of a Marwari Matriarch, Simon & Schuster (2020)
 Lockdown Laisons (2020)
 Small Betrayals − Hay House India, New Delhi, 2014
 Seventy And to Hell with It (2017)
 Shobhaa: Never a Dull De − Hay House India, New Delhi, 2013
 Shethji −2012
 Shobhaa at Sixty −Hay House India, New Delhi, 2010
 Sandhya's secret −2009
 Superstar India – From Incredible to Unstoppable
 Strange Obsession
 Snapshots
 Spouse: The truth about marriage (2005)
 Speedpost – Penguin, New Delhi. 1999.
 Surviving Men – Penguin, New Delhi, 1998
 Selective Memory – Penguin, New Delhi. 1998.
 Second Thoughts – Penguin, New Delhi. 1996.
 Small betrayals – UBS Publishers' Distributors, 1995
 Shooting from the hip – UBS, Delhi, 1994.
 Sultry Days – Penguin, New Delhi. 1994.
 Sisters – Penguin, New Delhi. 1992.
 Starry Nights – 1989, India, Penguin, New Delhi , Pub date ? ? 1989, paperback
 Socialite Evenings – 1989, India, Penguin, New Delhi , Pub date ? ?

See also
 Indian literature
 List of Indian writers

References

External links

 
 Shobhaade blogspot
 Book Review of Shobhaa De's new book titled Sethji
 Interview with Shobhaa De
 Times of India Blog
 
 Bhushan's Scholarly Literature Resources - Shobha De

1948 births
Living people
Female models from Maharashtra
Indian women novelists
21st-century Indian women writers
21st-century Indian writers
Indian socialites
St. Xavier's College, Mumbai alumni
Indian columnists
Indian women columnists
20th-century Indian women writers
20th-century Indian novelists
20th-century Indian journalists
21st-century Indian journalists
21st-century Indian novelists
Journalists from Maharashtra
Women writers from Maharashtra
People from Satara district
Novelists from Maharashtra
Marathi people